Yewendoch Guday is a 2007 Ethiopian romantic comedy film directed by Henok Ayele and produced by Arkey Sera Production. The film has been domestically successful and gained large viewers in national cinemas shortly since its release on 17 February 2007. Starring with Admassu Kebede and Rekik Teshome, the story revolves around principally the life of carpenter Amero, who was devastated by betrayal of his ex-girlfriend, and later encounters with future love interest Helena, who constantly bothers him into extravagant person.

Plot
Amero, a renowned carpenter, lives with seven co-worker friends namely Tejo, Solomon, Kecho, Tewedros, Emushu, Zerihun and Qecho in woodwork company under unnamed boss. Amero loses his ex-girlfriend who betrayed him and had affair with another man, but he kept promise to attend their wedding. In the wedding set, Amero along with his friends decide to revenge her by ruining the process, however he occasionally found Helina in the wedding, with her friend Martha. Confidentially, he want to please her, and they romantically fall in love. 

Amero and his comrade formed gentlemen alliance, which originally aimed for discussing sexual activity encountered by the group, but also to stalk Helena and Martha. Amero tried to sleep with Helena but both voluntarily disrupted the foreplay, which is recorded by his friends on mobile phone and the phone unexpectedly shut down, without hearing their ending. On the next day, Amero warmly received by his friends in order to tell the event from the beginning, but Amero told that he did not kiss her, leading to series disappointment. 

On other hands, Helena wanted to swindle Amero for unwanted incurrence; first she ordered to afford bracelet with expensive price. Meanwhile, his friends attempted to stole from her, without Aimro's knowledge. The bracelet indeed original, but by exchanging with counterfeit, she want to suffer him. Once he invited her in hotel, Helena deliberately damages property, crushing mirror and beer bottle in order to earn him extravagant. Helena's nagging become severe day to day, and eventually Helena falsely blames Amero for tricking counterfeit bracelet and leaves him. 

Distraught Amero, then decided to retire from his job. For the last time, Amero asserted his decision to leave her permanently, after which she remorsed shamefully. In the latter part, Helena consulted with the owner of woodwork and selected out Amero to design furniture inside her bedroom in order to approach him gently despite he scorn her. Upon reaching to workplace, Helena begins to distract the workplace by violently knocking door and kicking Amero's friends until she confront him inside warehouse. Helena requested for love and the confrontation ended when she grabbed piece of timber to hit him and romantically embraced each other, with friends celebratedly singing to the couple's fond.

Cast and characters
 Admasu Kebede as Amero
 Rekik Teshome as Helena
 Shewit Kebede as Martha
 Michael Million as Solomon
 Tewodros Seyoum as himself 
 Zerihun Asmamaw as himself
 Wesagn-Neh Hailu as Emushu
 Mesfin Haileyesus as Tejo
 Elsabeth Getachew as Qecho
 Unnamed boss as Shewaferaw Desalegn

Sequel
In 2009, its sequel titled Yewendoch Guday 2 was released and directing, writing and acting held by Admasu Kebede, while the cast except Michael Million reprises in the sequel.

References

External links
 

2007 films
2007 romantic comedy films
Ethiopian comedy films
Films about gender
Films about revenge
Workplace comedy films
Films set in Ethiopia